Frontiers is an ITV television crime drama series was produced by Carlton Television, broadcast between 7 May and 25 June 1996. The series, created by acclaimed writer Stephen Poliakoff, focuses on the rivalry between two rival police chiefs of the Special Crime Squad and their respective teams of officers. Co-written with Sam Donovan and Sandy Welch, only a single series of six episodes was broadcast, as despite a high-profile cast, including Kevin McNally, Clare Holman, Hywel Bennett and Philip Glenister, the series failed to impact audiences and was quickly axed. Amelia Bullmore, Fay Ripley and singer Sophie Ellis-Bextor also appeared in the series.

Thomas Sutcliffe of The Independent said of the series; "Stephen Poliakoff is noted as a Special Adviser to Frontiers. Stephen Poliakoff, the respected playwright, that is. This is inexplicable, unless they have simply ignored his advice, because Frontiers is the apotheosis of the Angry Shouting Copper show, a mail-order catalogue for every exhausted cliché of the genre – from the lazily rotating extractor fan which casts such a gothic light, to the stand-up rows in gloomy corridors. "Screw up on my territory again, and I'll make sure you're not in charge of a whelk stall before I'm finished with you."

Cast
 Kevin McNally as Superintendent Graham Kirsten 
 Peter Howitt as Superintendent Nick Jarratt 
 Simon Kunz as DCI Adrian Jackson 
 Clare Holman as DI Louise Raynor 
 Hywel Bennett as DS Eddie Spader 
 David Sibley as DCI David Lennox 
 Jay Villiers as DS Lacey 
 Philip Glenister as DS Danny Curtis 
 Kevin Dignam as DS Alick Jackson 
 Mac Andrews as DS Marshall 
 Dido Miles as DS Elsa Cooper 
 Chris Brailsford as DC Ryan
 Justin Chadwick as DC Clive Reilly
 Annie Keller as DC Lizzie Harlech 
 David Baukham as ACC Gordon Pierce
 Anthony Carrick as ACC Henry Barton 
 Amelia Bullmore as Caroline Poole 
 Fay Ripley as Elizabeth Kirsten 
 David Tse as DS Bailey 
 Vivienne Ritchie as Kate Jarratt 
 Sophie Ellis-Bextor as Rosie Jarrett

Episodes

References

External links

1996 British television series debuts
1996 British television series endings
1990s British crime television series
1990s British drama television series
ITV television dramas
1990s British television miniseries
Carlton Television
Television series by ITV Studios
English-language television shows
Television shows set in Liverpool